The Commission for constitutional reform is a commission instituted in Moldova by acting President Mihai Ghimpu to adopt a new version of the Constitution of Moldova (1994).

The commission for constitutional reform was set up under presidential decree (nr. 83) on 1 December 2009.

Overview 
The Venice Commission of the Council of Europe will decide whether or not the Republic of Moldova really needs to adopt a new Constitution or to amend the 1994 Main Law, in particular to revise the existing procedure of electing president of the republic.

According to Mihai Ghimpu, the new Constitution will be initially adopted by the Parliament by 50+ votes. A national referendum will be held afterward where the people will express their opinions on the new Constitution. The referendum took place by June 16, 2010.

The name of the official language will be also modified. According to Ghimpu, Romanian language must be the official language of Moldova. The possible constitutional reform will not cover the country's neutrality policy and the functioning of the state of law, Ghimpu added.

Membership 

President

Mihai Ghimpu - President of the Moldovan Parliament

Secretary

Ion Creangă - şef al Direcţiei juridice an Aparatului Parlamentului

Members:

Vladimir Filat          - Prime Minister of Moldova 
Serafim Urechean         - prim-vicepreşedinte of the Parliament of Moldova 
Alexandru Stoianoglo   - vicepreşedinte al Parlamentului
Marian Lupu              - preşedinte al Fracţiunii parliamentare a Democratic Party of Moldova
Mihai Godea              - preşedinte al Fracţiunii parliamentare a Liberal Democratic Party of Moldova
Ion Hadârcă              - preşedinte al Fracţiunii parliamentare a Liberal Party (Moldova)
Veaceslav Untilă        - preşedinte al Fracţiunii parliamentare a Partidului Party Alliance Our Moldova
Ion Pleşca               - preşedinte al Comisiei juridice, numiri şi imunităţi a Parlamentului
Aurel Băieşu             - vicepreşedinte al Comisiei juridice, numiri şi imunităţi a Parlamentului
Valeriu Nemerenco        - deputat în Parlament
Alexandru Tănase        - ministru al justiţiei
Gheorghe Susarenco      - viceministru al justiţiei
Mihail Formuzal         - Governor of Gagauzia (Gagauz-Yeri) 
Valeriu Zubco           - Procuror General
Alexandru Ohotnicov     - şef interimar al Direcţiei generale an Aparatului Preşedintelui Republicii Moldova
Victor Puşcaş            - judecător la Curtea Constituţională
Nicolae Timofti         - membru al Consiliului Superior al Magistraturii
Igor Dolea              - membru al Consiliului Superior al Magistraturii
Gheorghe Amihalachioaie -preşedinte al Consiliului Baroului Avocaţilor din Republica Moldova
Dorin Chirtoacă          -general mayor of Chişinău 
Alexandru Arseni         -conferenţiar universitar, doctor în drept
Gheorghe Avornic         -professor universitar, doctor habilitat în drept
Teodor Cârnaţ            -conferenţiar universitar, doctor habilitat în drept
Sergiu Cobăneanu         -professor universitar, doctor în drept
Marcel Cuşmir           -conferenţiar universitar, doctor habilitat în drept
Ion Guceac              -professor universitar, doctor habilitat în drept
Boris Negru             -conferenţiar universitar, doctor în drept
Nicolae Osmochescu       -professor universitar, doctor în drept
Victor Popa             -professor universitar, doctor habilitat în drept
Andrei Smochină          -professor universitar, doctor habilitat în drept
Sergiu Ţurcanu           -conferenţiar universitar, doctor în drept
Galina Bostan            -director al Asociaţiei Obşteşti „Centrul pentru Analiza şi Prevenirea Corupţiei”
Corneliu Gurin           -expert juridic la Asociaţia Obştească „Agenţia pentru Susţinerea Învăţămîntului Juridic şi a Organelor de Drept „EX-LEGE”
Igor Munteanu            -director executiv al Asociaţiei Obşteşti „Institutul pentru Dezvoltare şi Iniţiative Sociale „Viitorul”
Ştefan Urîtu             -preşedinte al Comitetului Helsinki pentru Drepturile Omului din Republica Moldova
Nicolai Buceaţchi        -politolog.

On December 4, 2009, at the first meeting of the Constitutional Reform Commission of the Republic of Moldova it was created the Working Group research and analysis in the following composition:

Victor Popa -president 
Ion Creangă – secretary

Membri:
Alexandru Arseni
Gheorghe Avornic
Teodor Cârnaţ
Serghei Cobăneanu
Marcel Cușmir
Ion Guceac
Boris Negru
Nicolae Osmochescu
Andrei Smochină
Sergiu Țurcanu
Lilia Bordei

Footnotes

External links
 http://lex.justice.md/index.php?action=view&view=doc&lang=1&id=332938
 Decret privind constituirea Comisiei pentru reforma constituţională

Government agencies established in 2009
Communism in Moldova
Society of Moldova
Legal history of Moldova
Political history of Moldova
Alliance for European Integration
2009 in Moldova
2010 in Moldova
Reform in Moldova